Kasbe Tadawale is a village in the Osmanabad District in Maharashtra, India.  This village has a weekly market which attracts locals from surrounding villages.  It also has a railway station named Kallam Road.  The station was thus named because passengers originally took this route to Kallam, one of the tehsils in the Osmanabad district.
                                                          
The village celebrates Rama Navami, a nine-day festival which commemorates a number of mythological events.

Osmanabad district